The men's single sculls rowing event at the 2015 Pan American Games was held from July 11–15 at the Royal Canadian Henley Rowing Course in St. Catharines.

Schedule
All times are Eastern Standard Time (UTC-3).

Results

Heats

Heat 1

Heat 2

Repechages

Repechage 1

Repechage 2

Finals

Final B

Final A

References

Rowing at the 2015 Pan American Games